Carmen Hooker Odom is the former secretary of the North Carolina Department of Health and Human Services.  Governor Mike Easley appointed her Secretary in January 2001. Odom, a former Massachusetts legislator and health care lobbyist, has spent her professional life working in health and human services. As a lawmaker, she was the primary legislative author of both the 1991 Massachusetts comprehensive health reform legislation and the Children's Medical Security Plan, which targeted young children not covered by medical insurance.

In May 2007, Odom announced that she would resign as Secretary to become president of the Milbank Memorial Fund.  In March 2013 she stepped down as President of the fund, she then became advisor to the President. She served in that role from March 2013 to 2014. She is now a self employed independent consultant.

Prior to her appointment as head of the large state bureaucracy, she served as Vice President of Government Relations for Quintiles Transnational Corporation in Research Triangle Park. Odom served as the Group Vice President for Carolinas Healthcare System, now Atrium Health. She is also an adjunct professor at the UNC School of Public Health. She received a bachelor's degree in sociology and political science from Springfield College and a master's degree in regional planning from the University of Massachusetts Amherst.

Odom moved to North Carolina in 1995 when her husband, Michael Hooker, became chancellor of the University of North Carolina at Chapel Hill.  After his death, she married former state senator T. L. "Fountain" Odom.

See also

Milbank Memorial Fund

References

External links
 Odom's Connecticut DPH Profile 
 Odom's Facebook Page
 Article on Odom's term as NC HHS head

Living people
State cabinet secretaries of North Carolina
Year of birth missing (living people)
Women in North Carolina politics
Springfield College (Massachusetts) alumni
University of Massachusetts Amherst College of Social and Behavioral Sciences alumni
21st-century American women